Sarah Hammond Palfrey (December 11, 1823 – 1914) was an American novelist and poet who used the pseudonym. E. Foxton. She was born in Boston to John Gorham Foxton, a Unitarian minister, and  Mary Ann née Hammond Palfrey. She  lived in Cambridge, Massachusetts.

Some of her letters survive.

Writings

Harvest-home
Old times and new

Novels
Herman, or Young Knighthood Volume I and II, Lee and Shepard, Boston 1865
Agnes Wentworth
Katherine Morne

Poetry
Prémices
Sir Pavon and St. Pavon
King Arthur in Avalon
The Chapel the Chapel; And Other Poems, Christo Et Ecclesia (1880)

References

1823 births
1914 deaths